Gold Rush Daze is a 1939 Warner Bros. Merrie Melodies cartoon directed by Ben Hardaway and Cal Dalton. The short was released on February 25, 1939.

Plot

A dog-faced prospector drives to the hills to dig for gold. A local gas station attendant warns him that he is wasting his time, then goes on to tell the story of his own fruitless chase for gold; since 1849, he pursued strikes around the world and never had any success. The cartoon shows the attendant's various stops including the California Gold Rush, the Comstock Lode, and various other efforts globally that never (literally) pan out. Then, as the attendant finishes his story, a fellow rides up with news that there has indeed been gold found in the hills. The attendant steals the prospector's car to chase this rush, telling him he can have the gas station.

Included in the film is a short, farcical musical number, “My Sweetheart Needs Gold for Her Teeth."

References

External links

American animated short films
1939 animated films
1939 short films
Merrie Melodies short films
Warner Bros. Cartoons animated short films
Films directed by Ben Hardaway
Films directed by Cal Dalton
Animated films about dogs
Films set in 1849
Films about the California Gold Rush
Films scored by Carl Stalling
1930s Warner Bros. animated short films
American comedy short films
1930s English-language films
1930s color films